Peter P. Stevens (June 18, 1909 – May 5, 1989) was an American football player and coach of football, basketball, and baseball.  He played college football at Temple University from 1933 to 1935 and professionally in the National Football League (NFL) with the Philadelphia Eagles in 1936.  Stevens served as the head football coach at Ursinus College from 1941 to 1943 and again in 1946 and at his alma mater, Temple, from 1956 to 1959, compiling a career college football coaching record of 8–44–3.  In 1960, he became an assistant football coach at Drexel.  He was also the head basketball coach at Ursinus in 1942–43 and the head baseball coach at Temple from 1947 to 1952. Stevens died on May 5, 1989 at his home in West Melbourne, Florida.

Head coaching record

Football

References

External links
 

1909 births
1989 deaths
American football centers
Basketball coaches from Pennsylvania
Drexel Dragons football coaches
People from West Melbourne, Florida
Philadelphia Eagles players
Temple Owls baseball coaches
Temple Owls football coaches
Temple Owls football players
Ursinus Bears football coaches
Ursinus Bears men's basketball coaches
Sportspeople from Wilkes-Barre, Pennsylvania